Geir Borgan Paulsen (born 9 April 1957) is a Norwegian weightlifter and IFBB Pro bodybuilder active in the 1990s.  His highest placings in professional bodybuilding were at the 1991 Night of the Champions on New York, placing third, and at the Master's Olympia in 2002, also placing third.  He was a competitive weightlifter until the age of 26, when due to a work injury he was forced to retire from competitive weightlifting and became introduced to bodybuilding by a friend.  He has also been a championship football (soccer) player, skier and skater.

He is a native of the island city of Kragerø in Telemark, Norway, where he was born on 9 April 1957. He now operates a gym in Oslo and works as a personal trainer.

Bodybuilding career
Sources: Bodybuilding.com bio, Geirborganpaulsen.com Merits section

1982 IFBB European Amateur Championship (10th)
1983 IFBB European Amateur Championship (7th)
1984 IFBB World Amateur Championship (7th)
1985 IFBB World Amateur Championship (7th)
1986 IFBB European Amateur Championships (heavyweight, 6th)
1987 IFBB World Amateur Championships (heavyweight, 2nd)
1990 IFBB World Amateur Championships (heavyweight, 2nd)
1991 IFBB Grand Prix Denmark (8th)
1991 IFBB Grand Prix Finland (7th)
1991 IFBB Grand Prix Spain (8th)
1991 Mr Olympia, 16th
1991 IFBB Night of Champions, 3rd
1992 IFBB Night of Champions, 10th
1992 IFBB Pittsburgh Pro Invitational, 12th
1995 IFBB Houston Pro Invitational, 10th
1995 IFBB Night of the Champions, 18th
1997 IFBB Grand Prix Finland, 10th
2002 Master Olympia, 3rd

Weightlifting career
Source: Geirborganpaulsen.com Merits section

1976 World Championship Junior, 9th
1976 European Championship Junior, 6th
1977 Nordic Championship Junior, 2nd
1978 European Championship 13th
1978 Grenland Atlet club team gold
Norwegian Championship 2nd (3 times)
Norwegian records as Junior 9 times

References

1957 births
Living people
People from Kragerø
Norwegian bodybuilders
Norwegian male weightlifters
Professional bodybuilders
Sportspeople from Vestfold og Telemark
20th-century Norwegian people